John Paterson (died 1832) was a Scottish architect who trained with Robert Adam (1728–1792) whom he assisted with his work on Edinburgh University Old College and Seton House Castle.

Life
He was the second son of George Paterson (d. 1789) an Edinburgh architect and builder linked to Robert Mylne and living on St John Street in the Canongate in a building he had built with Francis Charteris, Earl of Wemyss and March and thereafter shared. Its site is remembered in the building Charteris Land, a modern building which replaced it. The family also owned a small estate at Monimail in Fife called Cunnochie. The estate passed to the oldest son (also George Paterson) on the death of the father.

John lived on St John Street until 1784 and then moved to Elgin to work with Sir James Grant.

He returned to Edinburgh in 1789 to oversee the building of Old College for Robert Adam. His business connection to Adam ended in 1791, whereafter he opened an office at 2 North Bridge. In 1820 he apprenticed Anthony Salvin.

The original concept for a road on the line of what is now Waterloo Place in Edinburgh was mooted by Paterson as early as 1790.

Just before death he is listed as living at 24 Buccleuch Place in Edinburgh's south side, just south of George Square.

Principal works
Monzie Castle, 1785–1790
Sundrum Castle, 1792.
Dundee Royal Infirmary, 1794
The Bridewell Prison, Duke Street, Glasgow, 1795
Longforgan Parish Church, 1795 (incorporating older tower)
Eglinton Castle, 1798
Barmoor Castle, c. 1801
Pinkie House, 1800
St Paul's Church, Perth, 1807
Barmoor Castle, Northumberland, 1801
Canaan Lodge, Edinburgh (as his own home), 1802 (demolished 1988 to build the Royal Blind School)
Harviestoun Castle near Dollar, 1804 for Crauford Tait (demolished 1971)
Leith Bank, Bernard Street, Leith, 1804
Magdalen Asylum, Canongate, Edinburgh, 1805 (demolished)
Winton House, 1805
Milbourne Hall, 1807
Seafield Baths, Leith, 1810
Stonehaven Sheriff Court, 1810
Kinghorn Manse, 1816
Brancepeth Castle County Durham, 1818-21

References

1832 deaths
Scottish architects
Year of birth missing